The World Series of Darts Finals is a non-ranking darts tournament held by the Professional Darts Corporation. It is classed as a PDC premier event. The tournament was held annually in November, but in 2020, it moved to September, and moved to October in 2021. The first three events were held in the Braehead Arena in Glasgow, Scotland, moved to the Multiversum Schwechat, Vienna, Austria for 2018, and moved to the AFAS Live, Amsterdam, Netherlands in 2019. In 2020, it returned to Austria, in the Salzburgarena, Salzburg, before its return to Amsterdam in 2021.

The playing field includes the top eight of the World Series of Darts ranking, and a further 16 players, which are a mix of invited players by the PDC and qualifiers.

History
The World Series of Darts began in 2013. The goal of these series of tournaments is to make darts more popular across the globe.

Two World Series tournaments were held in the first year: the Dubai Duty Free Darts Masters and the Sydney Darts Masters. In 2014, events in Singapore and Perth were added to the series, followed by Japan (Yokohama, then Tokyo in 2016) and Auckland in 2015, Shanghai in 2016, and the USA (Las Vegas) Melbourne and Germany (Düsseldorf) in 2017. Brisbane was added to the roster in 2018, and Gelsenkirchen replaced Düsseldorf for the German Masters. In 2019, the German Masters again moved, this time to Cologne, and the Auckland Masters became the New Zealand Darts Masters, and was relocated to Hamilton.

The best 8 players from the World Series Darts tournaments qualified for the finals tournament, which was inaugurated in 2015. This ranking is formed by the points that the player earns in the World Series tournament.

Stage points
The distribution of the points in each World Series tournament is:

Finals

Statistics
Finalist appearances

High averages

References

External links
World Series of Darts official website
World Series Of Darts Finals Winners at dartsdatabase.co.uk

+
Professional Darts Corporation tournaments
Recurring sporting events established in 2015
2015 establishments in Europe
Annual sporting events